Unmade Beds is a 1997 art house film by the British director Nicholas Barker set in the United States. It shows the lives of four New York singles, playing themselves.

It won the Bronze Horse prize for best 1997 feature film in the Stockholm International Film Festival.

References

External links
 

1997 films
Films set in New York City
British comedy-drama films
1990s English-language films
1990s British films